Matwiga is an administrative ward in the Chunya district of the Mbeya Region of Tanzania. In 2016 the Tanzania National Bureau of Statistics report there were 9,852 people in the ward, from 8,939 in 2012.

Villages / vitongoji 
The ward has 3 villages and 15 vitongoji.

 Matwiga
 Ilindi
 Konde
 Maendeleo
 Majengo
 Mlimani.
 Moyo
 Tankini
 Mazimbo
 Kiyombo
 Mavinge
 Mazimbo
 Isangawana
 Igomaa 
 Isangawana A
 Isangawana B
 Mkange
 Mpakani

References 

Wards of Mbeya Region